= Ivorian Liberation Movement =

Ivorian Liberation Movement (in French: Mouvement ivorien de libération) was an Ivorian opposition group, founded in 1959 in Paris.
